Women in documentary film describes the role of women as directors, writers, performers, producers, and other film industry professions. According to a 2017 study by San Diego University's Center for the Study of Women in Television and Film, women make up around thirty percent of the population of people working in the documentary film industry, worldwide.  In a separate study on the employment of women in indie films, the Center found that overall fewer woman directed independent films were screened at film festivals but that a higher percentage of woman directed documentary films were screened, at 8 films versus 13 documentary films directed by men. In an October 2015 Annenberg study, women documentarians in countries other than the U.S. were 40 percent likely to be “helmers” (in the top position) as opposed to 30 percent likely in the U.S. The study counted films with multiple countries involved “as other countries” but if the U.S. was involved it wasn't counted as “other countries.”

The world of documentary film and the Oscars were criticized in 2016 by entertainment attorney Victoria Cook, who commented that there is a “misperception that the (feature) documentary category is more inclusive, less sexist and less racist than the other categories" and noted that only two female documentary filmmakers have won Oscars in the documentary feature category in the last twenty years.

History 
Prior to the twentieth century women did work in documentary film and the major documentary movements, but their roles were typically limited to less visible ones such as research. German film director Leni Riefenstahl has been credited as pioneering the modern form of documentary film with her 1935 Nazi propaganda film Triumph of the Will. Other women, such as Ruby Grierson and Frances H. Flaherty, have also been named as pioneers of the genre whose work and influence has been overshadowed by their male counterparts and relatives. The more modern documentary filmmakers Safi Faye and Trinh T. Minh-ha have also been cited as influences in the University of Illinois Press book Women and Experimental Filmmaking, as they "contribute to a tradition of experimental documentary filmmaking that avoids the objectifying, colonialist tendencies of much documentary and ethnography."

China 
In China, the field of documentary filmmaking has been named as an emerging field that "[provides] essential resources for women directors". The creation of courses of study, documentary film festivals and television channels in Taiwan have helped encourage filmmakers and "contributed to a new tide of Taiwan documentary filmmaking", which in turn "helped produce generations of women filmmakers concerned with representing feminist issues and the local cultures, customs, and history of Taiwan."

List of female documentarians 

 Julia Bacha
 Ruth Beckermann
 Zero Chou
 Barbara Cranmer
 Osa Johnson
 Barbara Kopple
 Jodie Mack 
 Kay Mander 
 Tamara Milosevic
 Megan Mylan
 Laura Poitras
 Leni Riefenstahl
 Gulbara Tolomushova
 Mila Turajlić
 Jacqueline Veuve
 Ruby Yang
 Marina Zenovich
 Lydia Zimmermann
 Maliha Zulfacar
 Clio Barnard
 Mania Akbari
 Rachel Lears
 Ava DuVernay
 Nanfu Wang
 Elizabeth Chai Vasarhelyi
 Julia Reichert
 Petra Costa
 Bonni Cohen
 Gabriela Cowperthwaite
 Liz Garbus
 Jennie Livingston
 Amy Berg
 Barbara Kopple
 Stephanie Soechtig
 Samantha Futerman
 Jennifer Siebel Newsom
 Kimberlee Acquaro
 Lotje Sodderland
 Dawn Porter

External links 
 Polish Women of the Documentary Film World

References 

 
Film industry
Employment discrimination
Feminism and the arts
Sexism